The women's big air competition in snowboarding at the 2022 Winter Olympics was held on 14 February (qualification) and 15 February (final), at the Big Air Shougang in Beijing. Anna Gasser of Austria won the event, successfully defending her 2018 title. Zoi Sadowski-Synnott of New Zealand won the silver medal, and Kokomo Murase of Japan bronze, her first Olympic medal.

The 2018 silver medalist, Jamie Anderson, twice Olympic champion in slopestyle, and the bronze medalist, Sadowski-Synnott, qualified as well. Andreson did not qualify for the finals. At the 2021–22 FIS Snowboard World Cup, only two big air events were held before the Olympics. Gasser was second in both, and was leading the ranking, followed by Reira Iwabuchi and Murase. Laurie Blouin was the 2021 world champion, with Sadowski-Synnott and Miyabi Onitsuka being the silver and bronze medalists, respectively. Sadowski-Synnott was the 2021 X-Games winner, ahead of Anderson and Onitsuka.

Qualification

A total of 30 snowboarders qualified to compete at the games. For an athlete to compete they must have a minimum of 50.00 FIS points in Big Air or Slopestyle on the FIS Points List on January 17, 2022 and a top 30 finish in a World Cup event in Big Air or slopestyle or at the FIS Snowboard World Championships 2021. A country could enter a maximum of four athletes into the event.

Results

Qualification
 Q — Qualified for the Final

The top 12 athletes in the qualifiers advanced to the Final.

Final

References

Women's snowboarding at the 2022 Winter Olympics